The International Women's Boxing Hall of Fame (IWBHF) is a sports hall of fame located in Vancouver, Washington. It is dedicated to women's boxing, and was started by Sue TL Fox and her website Women Boxing Archive Network. The Hall of Fame has a board of 11 members, who vote on nominees who are submitted to the IWBHF by the public. Terri Moss, a 2015 inductee, says that the IWBHF helps show women's accomplishments in the sport. Their primary mission is to "call honorary attention to those professional female boxers (now retired) along with men and women whose contributions to the sport and its athletes, from outside the ring, have been instrumental in growing female boxing."

History
The International Women's Boxing Hall of Fame first surged as an idea in 2013, by Sue TL Fox, the Founder and Creator of Women Boxing Archive Network [WBAN]. That year the WBAN, a website dedicated to women's boxing exclusively, announced that steps were being taken to open the Hall of Fame.

The Hall of Fame's first inductee class was announced in April, 2014, and its first induction ceremony took place on July 11, 2014, and was attended by among others, Claressa Shields, women's boxing gold medalist at the 2012 London Olympic Games.

On July 4, 2021, the International Women's Boxing Hall of Fame announced that the event that takes place on August 14, 2021, at the Orleans Hotel & Casino, in Las Vegas, Nevada, has been declared a "Proclamation Day" by the Honorable Carolyn G. Goodman, Mayor of the City of Las Vegas as "Women's Boxing Day."  Mayor Carolyn G. Goodman said in the Proclamation Letter, "By virtue of the Authority given to me by the Laws of the State of Nevada and by the Charter of the City of Las Vegas, do hereby Proclaim, AUGUST 14, 2021 as "WOMEN'S BOXING DAY" in the city of Las Vegas and all Residents and Visitors to join me in celebrating the Inductees for the 2020-2021 International Women's Boxing Hall of Fame.  We congratulate the women boxers and other inductees for their hard work and dedication to the sport of boxing."

Inductees

2014 class
Barbara Buttrick
Bonnie Canino
Regina Halmich
Christy Martin
Christy Halbert
Lucia Rijker
Jo-Ann Hagen

2015 class
Laila Ali
Jeannine Garside
Deirdre Gogarty
Phyllis Kugler
Sparkle Lee
Terri Moss
Laura Serrano
Ann Wolfe

2016 class
Sumya Anani
Jane Couch
Elena Reid
Ann-Marie Saccurato
Giselle Salandy
Marian “Tyger” Trimiar
Britt Vanbuskirk
Jackie Kallen

2017 class
Aileen Eaton
Holly Holm
Daisy Lang
Ria Ramnarine
Ana María Torres
Ada Velez

2018 class
Myriam Lamare
Belinda Laracuente
Jessica Rakoczy
Mary Jo Sanders
Vonda Ward
Julie Lederman
Belle Martell
Bernie McCoy

2019 class
Carina Moreno 
Wendy Rodriquez 
Bridgett Riley 
Martha Salazar
Lisa Holewyne
Terri Cruz 
Melissa Fiorentino 
Pat Emerick 
David Avila
Stephen Blea
Blanca Gutierrez
Patricia Martinez-Pino

2020 class

Boxers
Sharon Anyos 
Lisa Brown 
Kelsey Jeffries 
Michele Aboro
Melinda Cooper
Valerie Mahfood 
Mary Ortega 
Isra Girgrah 
Jaime Clampitt
Graciela Casillas

Non-boxing category
Mary Ann Owen
Shelley Williams

2021 class

Boxers
Alicia Ashley 
Kathy Collins 
Gina Guidi 
Bonnie Mann
Anne Sophie Mathis
Ina Menzer 
Natascha Ragosina 
Marischa Sjauw 
Dora Webber
Jo Wyman

Non-boxing category
Roy Englebrecht
Carol Steindler

2022 class
International Women’s Boxing Hall of Fame Announcement.

Boxers
Eva Jones-Young
Margaret Sidoroff
Hannah Fox
Eliza Olson
Tori Nelson
Fredia Gibbs
Brooke Dierdorff
Tracy Byrd
Yvonne Reis
Delia Gonzalez
Susi Kentikian
Cora Webber

Non-boxing category
Tom Gerbasi
Rose Byrd (Posthumous)
Jimmy Finn
Rose Trentman

Relation to the IBHOF
The International Women's Boxing Hall of Fame has no working relations with the International Boxing Hall of Fame of Canastota, New York.

See also

Women Boxing Archive Network

References

External links

2014 establishments in Florida
Boxing museums and halls of fame
Women's boxing
Women's halls of fame
Halls of fame in Florida
Sports museums in Florida
Museums established in 2014